Ronald Dennis Cooper (5 February 1928 – 15 March 2023) was a British boxer. He fought as Ron Cooper and competed in the men's lightweight event at the 1948 Summer Olympics.

Cooper won the 1948 Amateur Boxing Association British lightweight title, when boxing out of the Royal Navy BC.

Cooper died on 15 March 2023, at the age of 95.

References

External links
 

1928 births
2023 deaths
British male boxers
Olympic boxers of Great Britain
Boxers at the 1948 Summer Olympics
Boxers from Greater London
Lightweight boxers